The Foldex cat, also known as the Exotic Fold, is a breed of cat developed in the Canadian province of Quebec. Currently, the breed is recognized by only one cat registry, the Canadian Cat Association. Foldexes are medium-sized cats with a rounded face, short legs, and folded ears. The latter are the defining feature of the breed. Their eyes are well-rounded and wide open, with pair of ears with small and smooth-edged tips. They are described as intelligent and sweet. They were first registered as New Breed by the Canadian Cat Association in 2006 and then finally granted the Championship status in 2010.

Origin
In 1995, the Foldex was first exhibited in a Show Hall in Quebec, Canada. It was originally produced by crossbreeding a Scottish Fold with an Exotic Shorthair, resulting in a cat with a comparatively rounder head, shortened nose, and folded ears.

The new breed received popularity among the public, with breeder Jeanne Barrette going on to working with the breed. Her contributions to the breed resulted in the Canadian Cat Association granting Foldex the status of Experimental Breed in November 1998. Eventually, it was officially accepted as a New Breed in August 2006.

Physical characteristics
The Foldex is known for its signature small, folded ears with round tips. However, only half of all Foldex inherit the folded ears gene, known as Folded. Those with non-folded ears are referred to as Straights, whose ears grow straight in their adult stage like other cat breeds. Folded kittens' ears begin to show a visible fold between 21 to 28 days old.

The Foldex's body stature is medium-built with strong muscles, short legs and a short neck. Their ears may resemble of Scottish Fold breed, but they only have one crease which folds forward and downwards, while Scottish Folds have multiple creases that result in their ears laying flat. Their coats vary from long to short hair, and are naturally dense and soft with variety of color and patterns. The Foldex breed has a round face with wide-open eyes. Their nose is longer than an Exotic Shorthair, but shorter than a Scottish Fold.

Temperament
Foldex cats have an affectionate personality and are loyal to their owners, enjoying petting and cuddling, and are considered to be great lap cats. Foldexes have the high curiosity drive to explore, and have an easy-going nature, approaching strangers without hesitation. They get along with children and other pets.

Foldexes are ideal for potentiate owners who live in an apartment, as they are not vocal breed. The Foldex is an intelligent breed that likes to play with toys and puzzles.

Health
Even though the Foldex is an overall healthy breed, they are genetically predisposed to a risk of feline polycystic kidney disease (PKD). They may develop cyst on their kidneys at an older age, making it important for older Foldex cats to get pre-screened for developing PKD. Foldexis can also be genetically predisposed to health conditions found in the Scottish Fold, such as congenital osteodystrophy, bone abnormalities, and respiratory issues. the average lifespan of a Foldex is twelve to fifteen years.

Care
Just like any other cat breed, Foldexes require regular claw trimming and teeth cleaning. It is recommended for a short-haired Foldex to be brushed weekly to distribute skin oils and remove dead skin. An occasional bath is also recommended. Long-haired Foldex cats need more frequent grooming, as their coat can get tangled easily and is more prone to matting and hairballs.

Foldexes require tight diet management compared to other breeds, as they are more prone to obesity. Two portions of dry food with one portion of wet food per day is recommended to prevent them from becoming overweight; this is ideally divided into a morning and evening meal.

Foldexes need lots of space to explore around the house, which provides them with daily exercise. A safe outdoor space can also be provided, for enrichment and further exercise. Foldexes require a high level of mental stimulation to keep their minds exercised along with body. Cat puzzles and toys are the great ways to intellectually engage with them.

References

See also

List of cat breeds
List of experimental cat breeds

Cat breeds
Cat breeds originating in Canada